Albina Abramovna Goldman (Suntarsky District, 4 September 1944) is the director of the Mirny Polytechnic Institute of the North-Eastern Federal University. She is a Russian philologist with a post-graduate degree in Philology.

Awards
She is an Honoured Education Worker of the Republic of Sakha (Yakutia), and an Honoured Higher Education Worker of the Russian Federation.

In 2015 she was awarded the status of "Primus Inter Pares" by the Russian Academy of Sciences.

References

1944 births
Living people
People from the Sakha Republic
Women academic administrators
Russian women academics
Russian academic administrators
Russian philologists
Women philologists
20th-century philologists
21st-century philologists